Elisabeth ("Betty") Anna Heukels (born 25 February 1942) is a retired medley swimmer from the Netherlands, who finished in sixth place in the 400 m individual medley at the 1964 Summer Olympics in Tokyo. She is married to former water polo player Hans Wouda, who competed for Holland at the 1968 and the 1972 Summer Olympics. She won the individual 400 m medley at the 1966 European Aquatics Championships.

References

External links

1942 births
Living people
Dutch female medley swimmers
Olympic swimmers of the Netherlands
Swimmers at the 1964 Summer Olympics
Swimmers from Rotterdam
European Aquatics Championships medalists in swimming
20th-century Dutch women